Caiazzo or Cajazzo is a city and comune in the province of Caserta (Campania) in Italy.

History 
In the Social War it rebelled from Rome, and its territory was added to that of Capua by Sulla.

In the Middle Ages it belonged to the Lombard Duchy of Benevento and the County of Capua. The episcopal see was founded in 966. Later Frederick II established here a Treasure Court. It had a castle which was enlarged by the Angevines and, during the reign of Alfonso V of Aragon, housed his mistress Lucrezia d'Alagno.  Later Caiazzo was the fief of numerous baronial families of the Kingdom of Naples.

Caiazzo was the seat of anti-royal rebellions at the times of the Neapolitan Republic, and also housed several Carbonari. Despite this, Caiazzo was one of the few towns in the kingdom whose population sided against Garibaldi's expedition which annexed southern Italy to Piedmont.

During World War II, retreating German troops massacred 22 civilians here.

Main sights 
Caiazzo has remains of Cyclopean or polygonal masonry walls, and under the Piazza del Mercato is a large Roman cistern, which for centuries continued to provide a good water supply.

The Lombard castle is still in existence.

Sister cities 
Caiazzo has a sister relationship with:

 Ochtendung, Germany, since 1996

References

Sources

Cities and towns in Campania
Castles in Italy
Roman sites of Campania